Gaspare Mannucci (1575-1642) was an Italian painter during the Baroque period in Lucca.

Biography
He painted (1638) a Crucifixion and Mary Madalen for the church of San Piercigoli in Lucca. He painted a Madonna with Saints Lawrence and Gervasius (1629) for the church of Santa Maria Forisportam. He is likely related to Pietro Mannucci who painted for the Pieve a San Paolo in 1632. He also painted an altarpiece for the church of San Salvatore in Lucca .

References

17th-century deaths
17th-century Italian painters
Italian male painters
Painters from Lucca
Italian Baroque painters
Year of birth unknown
1575 births